"Song in Blue" is a 1955 song co-written by Les Paul and recorded by Les Paul and Mary Ford. The song was released as a single.

Background
The song was released as a 7" vinyl 45 single on Capitol Records, 45-13229, F3015, backed with "Someday Sweetheart", in 1955. The song was composed by Les Paul, Monty Ford, and Celia Ryland and was published by the Iris-Trojan Music Corporation in New York. The single reached #17 on the Cash Box singles chart in January, 1955 during an 8-week chart run. The single reached no. 71 on the Record World pop singles chart the same year. "Someday Sweetheart" reached no. 39 on the Cash Box chart in a two-week chart run and no. 79 on the Record World chart.

References

Sources
Jacobson, Bob. Les Paul: Guitar Wizard. Madison, Wisconsin: Wisconsin Historical Society Press, 2012.
Shaughnessy, Mary Alice. Les Paul: An American Original. New York: W. Morrow, 1993.
Wyckoff, Edwin Brit. Electric Guitar Man: The Genius of Les Paul. Genius at Work! Berkeley Heights, N.J.: Enslow Publishers, 2008.

External links
1955 recording of "Song in Blue" by Les Paul and Mary Ford. archive.org.

Les Paul songs
Mary Ford songs
1955 songs
1955 singles
Capitol Records singles
Songs written by Les Paul